Sivkov is a Russian masculine surname, its feminine counterpart is Sivkova. It may refer to
Anatoly Sivkov (born 1952), Russian painter
Anna Sivkova (born 1982), Russian fencer

Russian-language surnames
Bulgarian-language surnames